According to Jainism, Ātman (soul) is eternal and never dies. According to Tattvartha Sutra which is a compendium of Jain principles, the function of matter (pudgala) is to contribute to pleasure, suffering, life and death of living beings.

Types of Deaths
According to Jain texts, there are 17 different types of death:

 Avici-marana
 Avadhimarana
 Atyantika-marana
 Vasaharta-marana
 Valana-marana
 Antahsalya-marana
 Tadhava-marana
 Bala-marana or Akama marana
 Pandita-marana or Sakama marana
 Balpandita-marana
 Chadmastha-marana
 Kevali-marana
 Vaihayasa-marana
 Guddhapristha-marana
 Bhaktapratyakhyana-marana
 Inginta-marana
 Padopagamana-marana

Akama Marana & Sakama Marana 
Out of all 17 types of Marana, two are considered important:

Akama Marana which refers to someone who has attachment to life and doesn't want to die but dies when his life is over. Therefore, he has died helplessly and not on his own accord. According to Jainism, this person is often one who is willingly or unwillingly ignorant to the concepts of rebirth, other worlds, and liberation of the soul.

Sakama Marana which refers to someone who is not afraid of death and who accepts it willingly and at ease. They understand that there is no way to avoid death and that it is a natural process. Sakama Marana can be further divided into 4 types. These are Samadhi marana, anasana, santharo, and sallekhana.

See also
 Sallekhana

Notes

References

Bibliography
Cort, John E. Jains in the World: Religious Values and Ideology in India. Oxford: Oxford University Press, 2000.
Laidlaw, James. Riches and Renunciation: Religion, Economy, and Society among the Jains. Oxford: Clarendon Press, 1995.
Shah, Natubhai. Jainism: The World of Conquerors. 2 vols. Brighton: Sussex Academic Press, 1998.

Jain practices
Jainism